was a town located in Kitasaitama District, Saitama Prefecture, Japan.

As of June 1, 2009, the town had an estimated population of 12,763 and a density of 608 persons per km². The total area was 21.00 km².

On March 23, 2010, Kitakawabe, along with the towns of Kisai and Ōtone (all from Kitasaitama District), was merged into the expanded city of Kazo. Kitasaitama District was dissolved as a result of this merger.

Dissolved municipalities of Saitama Prefecture
Kazo, Saitama